Immaculate Conception Delta is a private elementary school located in North Delta, British Columbia. It was founded by the Ursuline Sisters in 1959 and it belongs to the Catholic Independent Schools of the Vancouver Archdiocese. The kindergarten-7 school offers a well-rounded academic program for the children of the Immaculate Conception Parish community.  This school was one of many chosen to host the "Man of the Shroud" exhibit in 2013.

References 

Elementary schools in Delta, British Columbia
Educational institutions established in 1977
1977 establishments in British Columbia